Toi Ora Live Art Trust is an inner-city shared creative space in Auckland New Zealand that provides free services to adults receiving mental health treatment.  The trust is funded by both public and private sources including the Auckland District Health Board.  Toi Ora is notable in that it demonstrates a commitment from the traditional mental health services establishment to creative and artistic expression as an ongoing therapeutic response to mental illness.

Classes are tutored by practitioners who are artists themselves with experience and/or an understanding of the issues surrounding mental health. Studio space is available for individual or collaborative projects. Clients, referred to as "members," explore their creative ideas and potential in a supported environment.

Philosophy
Toi Ora is a consumer driven organization which sees itself as fundamentally different from drop-in centre s and occupational therapy programmes. Focus is on the arts, culture, and the creative process, rather than on mental illness. Exhibition and performance opportunities are provided through Toi Ora's own gallery and group art shows elsewhere. Toi Ora is a charitable trust governed by a board of at least 50% of mental health consumers.

Programs and facilities
Program includes creative writing, painting, drawing, printmaking, mosaic workshop, performance and acting,  music performance, multimedia, music recording, and Maori Arts.  Additional facilities and resources include open studio space, workshops, art materials, musical instruments, music recording facilities, publications, computer/internet access, exhibition performance and publishing opportunities, gallery tours, art and music resources including books videos and DVDs etc.

History
Toi Ora Live Art Trust was registered under New Zealand's Charitable Trusts Act of 1957 on July 13, 1995. The Trust was the initiative of a group of 15 people consisting of mental health consumers and support workers. Sara McCook Weir was the driving force behind the idea. After a personal experience of mental illness in the United Kingdom Sara came to live in New Zealand in 1992 and was a co-founder of the trust.

The initial premises were in a factory space above a spectacle shop in Mt Eden then a factory space above a mechanics workshop in Grey Lynn.  In August 2009 Toi Ora moved again to a larger premises with gallery space.

See also
 Art therapy

References

External links
 ToiOra.org.nz

Art therapy